Trem-like transcript 1 protein is a protein that in humans is encoded by the TREML1 gene.

TREML1 is located in a gene cluster on chromosome 6 with the single Ig variable (IgV) domain activating receptors TREM1 (MIM 605085) and TREM2 (MIM 605086), but it has distinct structural and functional properties. 

TREML1 enhances calcium signaling in an SHP2 (PTPN11; MIM 176876)-dependent manner (Allcock et al., 2003; Barrow et al., 2004).[supplied by OMIM]

References

Further reading